Leduc is a city in the province of Alberta, Canada.

History 
Leduc was established in 1891, when Robert Telford, a settler, who had bought land, in 1889, near a lake which would later bear his name. It was on that piece of land where the new settlement would take root. Telford established a stopping place for the stagecoach line that in 1889 connected Calgary to Edmonton. It became known as Telford's Place. Telford previously served as an officer for the North-West Mounted Police, and later became Leduc's first postmaster, first general merchantman, and first justice of the peace. He was also elected to serve as Leduc's first Member of the Alberta legislature (MLA)in 1905.

The establishment of the Calgary and Edmonton Railway, later acquired by the Canadian Pacific Railway, opened the region to settlement. The first train stopped at Leduc in July 1891.

Originally there were two versions to describe how Leduc got its name. In fact both accounts are true. In April 1886 when a settler (McKinley) setting up a telegraph office needed a name for the new station and decided that it would be named after the first person who came through the door of the telegraph office. That person was Father Hippolyte Leduc, a priest who had served the area since 1867. Five years later, in 1891, the Minister of the Interior and Superintendent of Indian Affairs, who had been Lieutenant-Governor of the North-West Territories, Edgar Dewdney (1835–1916), was given a list of names, that had been provided to the railroad by Father Lacombe, decided that Telford Place should be renamed at the time the railway terminal was being established. Father Leduc's name was on the list and since the telegraph station was already called Leduc Dewdney saw no reason why not to use Leduc's name for the new railroad station and the hamlet that was growing alongside.

Leduc was incorporated as a village in 1899, and became a town in 1906. It became a city in 1983; by that time its population had reached 12,000.

The town continued to grow quietly over the decades and Alberta's historical oil strike on February 13, 1947, occurred near the town at the Leduc No. 1 oil well.

Geography 
On the east end of the city lies Telford Lake, and just to the east is Saunders Lake.
Alexandra Park Ponds
Coady Lake
Leduc Reservoir
Telford Lake
West Point Lake

Demographics 

Results from the 2017 Leduc Census revealed a new population count of 31,130 - a growth rate of two percent over 2016.

Economy 

The City of Leduc is a founding member of the Leduc-Nisku Economic Development Association, an economic development partnership that markets Alberta's International Region in proximity to the Edmonton International Airport. The city forms part of this international transportation and economic region. It is on the CANAMEX Trade Corridor at the intersection of two Canadian Pacific Railway lines and is adjacent to the Edmonton International Airport. These transportation links support the petrochemical activities in Alberta's Industrial Heartland, the Fort McMurray area, and other economic hubs.

The oil and gas industry has long been the base of Leduc's economy. The Leduc Business Park, in the northern portion of the city, contains more than 1,400 businesses. The Nisku Industrial Park, located to the north within Leduc County, also contains many businesses.

Arts and culture 
Leduc is home to the Maclab Centre for the Performing Arts, a preeminent performing arts facility with a 460-seat theatre.

In fall 2009, the Leduc Recreation Centre was opened. The  facility includes three NHL-sized arenas, an aquatic centre, an 8 sheet curling rink, twin multi use field houses, a  fitness center and 4 lane running track,  restaurants, child care facilities, several conference rooms, and the outreach learning centre. In 2022, Curling Stadium Leduc opened inside the Leduc Curling Club, offering live broadcasts from all games played.

Adjacent to the LRC is William F. Lede park. The 200 acre park has a variety of amenities including; 7 baseball diamonds, beach volleyball courts, a soccer pitch, twin rugby fields and clubhouse, 2 U-12 soccer fields, community gardens, a 40 acre off-leash dog park as well as access to 8 km of multi-way trails looping around Telford Lake. Neighbouring the rugby house is the Leduc Boat Club, in 2004 the club developed Telford Lake for rowing sports as it hosted the 2005 World Masters Games.

Media 
Local newspaper, the Leduc Representative (the Leduc Rep), and the regional newspaper, the Leduc-Wetaskiwin Pipestone Flyer, serve Leduc.

Leduc's first FM radio station, CJLD-FM, began in 2013 and is known on-air as "93.1 The One".

An internet-based community radio station, branded "Leduc Radio" since 2008, also serves the city.

Due to its proximity to Edmonton, all major Edmonton media (print, radio and television) also serve Leduc and its surrounding area.

Emergency services 
The City of Leduc has its own fire services and emergency management departments. Led currently by fire chief and director of emergency management Bryan Singleton, the Fire Services Department comprises full and part-time members providing fire, ambulance and patient transportation services to the city and portions of Leduc County to the west, south and east.

The Royal Canadian Mounted Police (RCMP) provide police services, supported by the city's Enforcement Services Department, which consists of Peace Officers appointed by the Alberta Solicitor General.

Climate
Leduc experiences a humid continental climate (Köppen Dfb) closely bordering on a subarctic climate (Dfc). Summers are typically warm and rainy with cool nights. Winters are typically long, very cold, and very dry with moderate snowfall. Precipitation usually peaks during July, which is also the sunniest month.

See also 
Leduc Public Library
List of communities in Alberta
List of cities in Alberta

References

External links 

 
1899 establishments in the Northwest Territories
Cities in Alberta
Edmonton Metropolitan Region